O'Rourke family of Livonia is a branch of Irish O'Rourkes. It descends from Cornelius O'Rourke (1736-1800), who went to Russian military service and became commandant of Dorpat. From his sons begin two family branches, the Livonian Lutheran branch and the Polish Roman Catholic branch. The most notable member of the family was Cornelius' son Joseph Cornelius O'Rourke (1772–1849), general in Russian service. Joseph's grandson Edward O'Rourke became bishop of Danzig.

References

External links
 Genealogisches Handbuch der baltischen Ritterschaften Teil 1, 1: Livland. Görlitz 1929
 O'Rourkes in Russia, Hogans Stand
 The Arms and the Title of the Counts O’Rourke, Nobles of the Russian Empire
The Irish O'Reilly family and their connections to Austria and Russia by Stefan M. Newerkla, with chapter 3.2 on the family O'Rourke in the Russian and Austrian context